Mepham is a surname. Notable people with the surname include:

Chris Mepham (born 1997), Welsh footballer
Dennis Mepham (born 1958), American soccer player
Kirsty Mepham (born 1969), British equestrian
Simon Mepeham (died 1333), English bishop